Qaanaaq Municipality was the only municipality in the county of North Greenland (Avannaa). It is now part of the municipality of Avannaata.

On January 22, 1968, a B-52 crashed 11 km (7 mi) south of Thule Air Base. Nuclear bombs were lost and debris scattered over the area in the accident.

The municipality has a population of 850 (as of 1 January 2005). The town of Qaanaaq has a population of 640. In addition to the town, there are five inhabited villages:
Savissivik: pop. 78, in the northern part of Melville Bay, in the south of the municipality
Moriusaq: 21 (about 30 km (19 mi) off Thule Air Base)
Qeqertat: 22 (on the main island of the Harward Øer)
Siorapaluk: 87 (one of the northernmost settlements in the world at 77°47'N)

All villages are losing population, since people are moving to the town. Historically, the number of villages has been higher, but some have been abandoned. This process of population concentration in the towns is observed through all of Greenland.

Etah, an abandoned village which once was the northernmost village of the world (at 78°19'N), lies 78 km (48 mi) northwest of Siorapaluk.  Annoatok, once a small hunting station, was slightly further north (at 78°33'N) and about 24 km (15 mi) from Etah.

The municipality has an area of 225,500 km2 (87,066 mi2), a large portion of which is ice cap area. It is the largest municipality in Greenland and one of the largest in the world (the surface area is larger than the United Kingdom). It borders on Upernavik Municipality on the south, on the unincorporated area of the Northeast Greenland National Park on the east, on the Arctic Ocean on the north, and on the Nares Strait, which separates North Greenland from Ellesmere Island of Nunavut, Canada on the west.

References

External links 

 DIIS Report 2009:18 on the fate of the four bombs

Former municipalities of Greenland